Terminalia paniculata is a tree native to southwest India (including the Western Ghats and Karnataka).  Known in the timber trade as kindal, it has a variety of names in local languages.

It is economically important for wood, medicinal uses, and raising silkworms.

References

paniculata